The Faroe Islands have a multi-party system, with numerous parties in which no one party often has a chance of gaining power alone, and parties must work with each other to form coalition governments.

There are two major ideological cleavages in Faroese politics.  In addition to the left-right spectrum, parties are also divided between those that want to maintain the Faroes' place within the Danish Realm ('unionists') and those that want Faroese independence ('separatists').

The current government is formed by a coalition between the two major centre-right parties, the Union Party and the People's Party, and the small, centrist Centre Party and Self-Government Party.

Political parties with elected representation at a national level 
There are currently seven parties represented in the Løgting. The two largest parties – each with eight seats – represent centre-right unionism and centre-right separatism, while the next two – each with six seats – represent centre-left unionism and left-wing separatism. There are also three minor parties in the Løgting.

Defunct parties
Advancement for the Islands (Marxist–Leninist) (Oyggjaframi (marx-leninistar))
Business Party (Vinnuflokkurin)
Faroese Communist Party (Kommunistiski flokkur Føroya)
Christian People's Party (Kristiligi fólkaflokkurin), formerly known as the Progress Party (Framburðsflokkurin)
Faroese Socialists (Føroyskir Sosialistar)
Faroese Party (Hin føroyski flokkurin)
Freedom Union (Frælsisfylkingin)
Funny Party (Hin stuttligi flokkurin)
Progress Party (Framsóknarflokkurin)
The Red 1 May Group
Separatist Party (Loysingarflokkurin)
Social Separatist Party (Sosialistiski loysingarflokkurin)
Worker's Union (Verkamannafylkingin)

See also

Lists of political parties

Faroe Islands
 
Political parties
Political parties